Deltathree Inc. is an American company engaged in the business of voice over IP telephony services. The  company  was one of the first in the world to offer a telephony service over the internet, reducing the cost of international calls by over 90 percent.

Users can either use the free softdialer product and make calls through their computer, or sign up for the broadband phone service and receive an Analog Telephony Adapter (ATA) or the linksys PAP2 device. Both devices allows users to plug a standard phone into their internet connection and make calls independent of the PC.

History
Deltathree was founded in 1996 by Dmitry Goroshevsky, Sophia Babkove, Elie Wurtman and Jacob Ner David to develop an Internet-based international low cost calling service using VoIP technology, and a "PC to Phone" solution, using a technology developed by Israeli company VocalTec Communications. RSL Communications, an investment firm owned by Ronald Lauder, acquired a majority stake in Deltathree the following year, before the company listed on the NASDAQ stock exchange in November 1999. Elie Wurtman served as CEO from the company's founding until the November 1999 IPO. During that time, Wurtman completed the first historic transcontinental phone-to-phone VoIP call with FCC Chairman Reed Hundt. In 2001, RSL Communications sold its stake in the company to billionaire entrepreneur Yitzhak Tshuva who later sold his shares at a profit.

In 2001, the original company founders left to start a new company, CrossOptix, that developed ultra-high speed optical interconnect solutions; Noam Bardin was appointed as CEO, Bardin left in 2007 and later become CEO of popular GPS application Waze.

The company's shares were delisted by NASDAQ in March 2008 after falling below $1, forcing Deltathree stock to trade through the OTC Bulletin Board.

In December 2009, Deltathree announced that it had sold a majority stake (54.3%) to Australian company D4 Holdings for $1.17 million in cash. Under the agreement D4 also has the right to pick up an additional 30 million shares at 4 cents a share for the next ten years.

Operations
Deltathree's research and development facility, and operational center is based at the Jerusalem Technology Park.

Deltathree offers its VOIP services to the residential, commercial and small business market, as well as offering a hosted white label turnkey VOIP solution to enterprises. Deltathree segments its customer base into three areas: Direct to End User, Resellers, and Hosted VOIP.

Direct to End User includes the iConnectHere Voice Over IP products, which can be used by either residential customers or small businesses. iConnectHere provided VOIP calls either through the software available via download this works in a similar fashion to Skype. Users can also use their own standard phone if plugged into an ATA or a Linksys.

Resellers typically includes internet cafés and call centers that offer low cost routing to their own customers.

Hosted VOIP: For large enterprises with the necessary infrastructure and investment can integrate the Deltathree VOIP network giving them total control over billing, customer service and pricing. Yor Voice is an example VoIP company that is listed under this category.

References

Further reading
 MFFAIS - Mutual Fund Facts About Individual Stocks – Deltathree Inc (DTZ.BE) latest rank by number of funds buying

External links
 deltathree website
 finance.yahoo.com/q?s=DDDC
 finance.google.com/finance?q=NASDAQ%3ADDDC

Telecommunications companies of the United States
VoIP companies of the United States
Companies based in New York City
Software companies of Israel
Companies based in Jerusalem